The men's 4×100 metre freestyle relay took place on 15 August at the Olympic Aquatic Centre of the Athens Olympic Sports Complex in Athens, Greece.

The South African team (Roland Mark Schoeman, Lyndon Ferns, Darian Townsend, and Ryk Neethling) set a new world record of 3:13.17 to solidify their country's triumph with a gold medal in the event. Defending Olympic champion Pieter van den Hoogenband swam a fastest split of 46.79 to take the silver for the Dutch in a national record of 3:14.36, leaving the U.S. team of Ian Crocker, Michael Phelps, Neil Walker, and Jason Lezak with the bronze in 3:14.62, their worst result in Olympic history.

Records
Prior to this competition, the existing world and Olympic records were as follows.

The following new world and Olympic records were set during this competition.

Results

Heats

Final

References

External links
Official Olympic Report

M
4 × 100 metre freestyle relay
Men's events at the 2004 Summer Olympics